John Hopkins Foster (January 31, 1862 – September 5, 1917) was an American lawyer and politician who served two terms as a U.S. Representative from Indiana from 1905 to 1909.

Early life and career 
Born in Evansville, Indiana, Foster attended the common schools of his native city and was graduated from Indiana University at Bloomington in 1882 and from the law department of Columbian University (now George Washington University), Washington, D.C., in 1884.

He was admitted to the bar in 1885 and commenced the practice of his profession in Evansville, Indiana.

Political career 
He served as member of the  Indiana State House of Representatives  in 1893.
He served as judge of the superior court of Vanderburg County 1896–1905.

Congress 
Foster was elected as a Republican to the Fifty-ninth Congress to fill the vacancy caused by the resignation of James A. Hemenway.
He was reelected to the Sixtieth Congress and served from May 16, 1905, to March 3, 1909.
He was an unsuccessful candidate for reelection in 1908 to the Sixty-first Congress.

Later career and death 
He resumed the practice of law in Evansville, Indiana, where he died September 5, 1917.
He was interred in Oak Hill Cemetery.

References

   

1862 births
1917 deaths
Politicians from Evansville, Indiana
Indiana lawyers
Indiana University alumni
George Washington University Law School alumni
19th-century American politicians
Republican Party members of the United States House of Representatives from Indiana